Kalleh-ye Shurehi (also Romanized as Kalleh-ye Shūreh’ī; also known as Jaʿfarābād) is a village in Taftan-e Jonubi Rural District, Nukabad District, Khash County, Sistan and Baluchestan Province, Iran. At the 2006 census, its population was 233, in 50 families.

References 

Populated places in Khash County